Cole Kehler (born December 17, 1997) is a Canadian professional ice hockey goaltender who is currently an unrestricted free agent. He most recently played with the Utah Grizzlies in the ECHL.

Playing career
After being selected by the Kamloops Blazers of the Western Hockey League in the 2012 Bantam Draft, Kehler competed for the starting goaltender position with Connor Ingram during the 2014–15 season. After two partial seasons of poor performance with Kamloops, Kehler was assigned to play for the Merritt Centennials of the British Columbia Hockey League and was named the starting goalie.

The Blazers traded Kehler's WHL rights to the Portland Winterhawks in August, 2016. He played for Portland between 2016 and 2018, guiding the Winterhawks to playoff appearances in both seasons. After attending the Winnipeg Jets Skills Development Camp in 2017, Kehler signed a professional contract with the Los Angeles Kings.

Kehler made his professional debut in 2018 with the Kings secondary affiliate, the Manchester Monarchs of the ECHL.

After leaving the Kings organization as a free agent, as he was not tendered a qualifying offer, Kehler was later was offered a professional tryout to attend training camp with the Winnipeg Jets. He released by the Jets following the conclusion of training camp and later signed a one-year AHL contract with affiliate, the Manitoba Moose, on January 24, 2021. Kehler appeared in 1 game with the Moose, before he was signed by the Winnipeg Jets for the remainder of the season to add insurance depth on April 9, 2021.

In the following off-season as a pending restricted free agent, Kehler's rights were not retained by the Jets after failing to receive a qualifying offer. As a free agent, Kehler signed a contract in the ECHL to join the Rapid City Rush to open the 2021–22 season. Following two games with the Rush, Kehler was traded to the Cincinnati Cyclones on November 30, 2021. He appeared in 4 games with the Cyclones before he was traded a month later on December 30, to the Utah Grizzlies.

Career statistics

References

External links
 

1997 births
Living people
Canadian ice hockey goaltenders
Cincinnati Cyclones (ECHL) players
Fort Wayne Komets players
Ice hockey people from Manitoba
Kamloops Blazers players
Manchester Monarchs (ECHL) players
Manitoba Moose players
Merritt Centennials players
Ontario Reign (AHL) players
Portland Winterhawks players
Rapid City Rush players
Utah Grizzlies (ECHL) players